École Belge Burundi (EBB) formerly École Belge de Bujumbura is a Belgian international school in Bujumbura, Burundi. It serves students ages 3–18, in maternelle (preschool) through secondaire (secondary school). The school supports both Francophone and Dutch-speaking students.

History
The school opened in September 1965 and the Burundian government recognised the school through a ministerial decree passed on 3 July 1969. The school reopened in 1996 despite an embargo put on the Burundian government.

Student body
As of 15 October 2014 the school had 509 students. This was an increase from its October 1996 figure, 233 students.

References

External links
  École Belge Burundi
  

Schools in Bujumbura
International schools in Burundi
Belgian international schools
1965 establishments in Burundi
Educational institutions established in 1965